

This is a list of the National Register of Historic Places listings in Orange County, California.

This is intended to be a complete list of the properties and districts on the National Register of Historic Places in Orange County, California, United States. Latitude and longitude coordinates are provided for many National Register properties and districts; these locations may be seen together in an online map. These historic sites reflect the region's Native American, Spanish and Mexican ethnic heritage. They include historic mansions from the eras of wealth created by citrus farming and oil discovery and reflect political leadership and scientific achievements, as well as other themes.

There are 132 properties and districts listed on the National Register in the county, including 2 National Historic Landmarks.  Another property was once listed but has been removed.

Current listings 

|}

Former listing 

|}

See also 

 List of National Historic Landmarks in California
 National Register of Historic Places listings in California
 California Historical Landmarks in Orange County, California

References 

Orange

History of Orange County, California
Protected areas of Orange County, California